New Ghost is the fifth studio album by Hate Dept., released on August 27, 2013 by Awful Noise Records.

Track listing

Personnel
Adapted from the New Ghost liner notes.

 Steven Seibold – lead vocals, programming, production

Release history

References

External links 
 
 New Ghost at Bandcamp
 

2013 albums
Hate Dept. albums